St. James Episcopal Church is a historic Episcopal church at 131 North State Street in Painesville, Ohio. The main building was built in 1865 in a Gothic Revival style and was added to the National Register of Historic Places in 1975.

See also
National Register of Historic Places listings in Lake County, Ohio

References

External links
 St. James Episcopal Church - church website

National Register of Historic Places in Lake County, Ohio
Churches completed in 1865
Episcopal churches in Ohio
Churches on the National Register of Historic Places in Ohio
Gothic Revival church buildings in Ohio
Churches in Lake County, Ohio
19th-century Episcopal church buildings